R. Krishnan may refer to:

 R. Krishnan (director) (1909–1997), Indian film director, of the duo Krishnan–Panju
 R. Krishnan (politician), Indian politician
 R. S. Krishnan (1911–1999), Indian physicist
 Ramanathan Krishnan (born 1937), Indian tennis player
 Ramesh Krishnan (born 1961), Indian tennis player